The Coupe de France 1999–2000 was its 83rd edition. It was won by the FC Nantes Atlantique, which defeated Calais RUFC in the final.

Round of 16

Quarter-finals

Semi-finals

Final

Topscorer
Antoine Sibierski (6 goals)

References

French federation
1999–2000 Coupe de France at ScoreShelf.com

1999–2000 domestic association football cups
1999–2000 in French football
1999–2000